Daffodil Days may refer to:

 Daffodil Day (Canada), a campaign organised by the Canadian Cancer Society since 1957
 A similar campaign organised by the American Cancer Society since the 1970s
 Daffodil Day (Australia), the Cancer Council Australia version of the event, running since 1986
 Daffodil Day (Ireland), the Irish Cancer Society's version of the campaign, running since 1988
 The Cancer Society of New Zealand's version of the campaign, running since 1990